Fig Tree is a 2018 internationally co-produced drama film directed by Alamork Davidian. In July 2018, it was one of five films nominated for the Ophir Award for Best Picture. The film was screened at the 2018 Toronto International Film Festival, where Davidian won the Eurimages Audentia Award for Best Female Director.

References

External links
 

2018 films
2018 drama films
Israeli drama films
Amharic-language films
French drama films
German drama films
2010s French films
2010s German films